Meritorious Artist  Hồ Ngọc Xum (born 15 February 1955) is a Vietnamese film director.

Biography
Hồ Ngọc Xum was born on 15 February 1955 at Phú Tân District, An Giang Province, Republic of Vietnam. He has graduated at Saigon Literary University and Hanoi Academy of Theatre and Cinema as a film director.

Career

 Flame of Krong Jung (Ngọn lửa Krong Jung, 1980)
 Ngọn cỏ gió đùa (movie, 1989)
 Con nhà nghèo (1998)
 Ân oán nợ đời (2002)
 Không thể siết cò (2003)
 Nợ đời (2004)
 Đời thương hồ
 Cay đắng mùi đời (2007)
 Giá mua một thượng đế (2007)
 Tại tôi (2009)
 Cuộc phiêu lưu của hai lúa (2009)
 Tân Phong nữ sĩ (2009)
 Love Case (Tình án, 2009)
 Khóc thầm (2010)
 Lòng dạ đàn bà (2011)
 Giông bão Hai khối tình Ngọn cỏ gió đùa (TV-series, 2016)
 Duyên định kim tiền (2017)
 Tơ hồng vấn vương'' (2017)

Honor
 Golden Kite for the best drama.
 Golden Kite for the best movie.

References

 Hồ Biểu Chánh làm nên tâm hồn tôi
 Đạo diễn Hồ Ngọc Xum : Thiếu vốn sống làm phim sẽ dở

1955 births
People from An Giang Province
Vietnamese film directors
Living people